Kavaklıdere is a neighbourhood of Çankaya district in Ankara, capital of Turkey.

References

Neighbourhoods of Çankaya